Strangers in the Night - The Music of Bert Kaempfert is the Berlin Jazz Orchestra's first home video, released on DVD September 21, 2012 by Polydor/Universal Entertainment. The DVD is a live recording from the Alte Oper on February 12, 2008 in Frankfurt, Germany.

History

Strangers in the Night - The Music of Bert Kaempfert is the Berlin Jazz Orchestra's first home video, released on DVD September 21, 2012.   This was produced using a big band, strings and choir, playing the music of Kaempfert's and conducted by former alumni, trombonist Jiggs Whigham.   The DVD documents and is an edited production of one of four concerts the Berlin Jazz Orchestra performed in early 2008.    The particular concert documented/presented on the DVD is a live recording and video from Frankfurt, Germany at the Alte Oper on February 12, 2008.

On DVD the recording includes Kaempfert’s well known songs such as Spanish Eyes, Wonderland By Night, You Turned My World Around and Strangers In The Night.   Soloists included Ack van Rooyen (flugelhorn, trumpet), Herb Geller (saxophone, flute), Jiggs Whigham (trombone) and Ladi Geisler (bass) together with several of Bert Kaempfert’s past musicians from his orchestras. This concert and DVD includes jazz singers Sylvia Vrethammar, Marc Secara as well as pianist and entertainer Joja Wendt.

Promotion

The live recording for Polydor Records originated from the concert of February 12, 2008 at the Alte Oper in Frankfurt, Germany.  The concert/DVD was toured in four different German cities to Include Berlin, Frankfurt, Düsseldorf and  Hamburg.   Follow up to this CD is Now and Forever - Secara meets Kaempfert released by Silver Spot Records in 2011.

Reception/Professional ratings 

A whirring sound carpet is laid down by the Berlin Jazz Orchestra (sic)...made impressive for provoking a renewable generation of Jazz.

Dresdner Neueste Nachrichten

The young singer Marc Secara would actually stand where Roger Cicero is today, because he has it (to make it short).

Jazzthetic

Track listing

Personnel

Conductor – Jiggs Whigham
Arranged By – Bert Kaempfert, Herbert Rehbein, Jörg Achim Keller
Contractor – Maraike Niemz
Trombone (solo) - Jiggs Whigham
Trumpet and flugelhorn (solo) – Ack van Rooyen
Guitar and bass (solo) -  Ladi Geisler
Featured vocalists – Marc Secara, Sylvia Vrethammar
Alto Saxophone and flute– Herb Geller, Nico Lohmann
Tenor Saxophone and flute – Patrick Braun, Thomas Walter
Baritone Saxophone and flute – Grégoire Peters
Trumpet – Daniel Collette, Jürgen Hahn, Martin Gerwig, Nikolaus Neuser
Trombone – Arne Fischer, Christoph Hermann, Ralph Zickerick, Simon Harrer
Guitar – Jeanfrançois Prins
Piano – Claus-Dieter Bandorf, Joja Wendt
Bass – Ralph Graessler
Drums – Jean Paul Hochstädter
Strings – Frankfurt Strings
Backing Vocalists – Esther Kaiser, Kristofer Benn, Sarah Kaiser

Release history

References

External links

2008 albums
Jazz albums by German artists
Big band albums
Instrumental albums